Weston Dickson Fisler (July 6, 1841 – December 25, 1922) was a professional baseball player who played for the Philadelphia Athletics from 1871 to 1876. He was an infielder/outfielder who threw right-handed.

Fisler debuted on May 20, 1871, for Philadelphia. In his rookie year, he appeared in 28 games, driving in 16 runs and stealing 6 bases. In 1872, he recorded 48 RBI and had a batting average of .350. He hit his first career home run in 1873.  Fisler is credited with scoring the first run in Major League Baseball history on April 22, 1876.

Fisler played three more years with the Athletics and retired after the 1876 season. He retired with 414 career hits, two career home runs, and 189 RBIs in 273 games. In his career, Fisler played 124 games at first base, 120 games at second base, 35 games at outfield, and one at shortstop.

Fisler died at age 81 on December 25, 1922, in Philadelphia, Pennsylvania and was interred at Laurel Hill Cemetery.

Citations

External links

1841 births
1922 deaths
19th-century baseball players
Baseball players from Camden, New Jersey
Burials at Laurel Hill Cemetery (Philadelphia)
Major League Baseball first basemen
Major League Baseball second basemen
Philadelphia Athletics (NABBP) players
Philadelphia Athletics (NA) players
Philadelphia Athletics (NL) players
Philadelphia Athletic players